Bizjak may refer to:

 Boris Bizjak (born 1981), London-based Slovenian flautist
 Julijana Bizjak Mlakar, Slovenian politician
 Jurij Bizjak (born 1947), Slovenian Roman Catholic prelate
 Lidija Bizjak (born 1976), Serbian concert pianist
 Lovro Bizjak (born 1993), Slovenian footballer
 Sanja Bizjak (born 1988), Serbian pianist

Slovene-language surnames